The former United States Post Office in The Dalles, Oregon, United States, is a historic building constructed in 1916. Executed from standardized federal plans in the Greek Revival style, it was the first federal building in The Dalles and one of a set of nine built in Oregon in the 1910s. It remained in operation as a post office longer than seven of the other eight in that group. The building was added to the National Register of Historic Places in 1985.

See also
National Register of Historic Places listings in Wasco County, Oregon

References

External links

, National Register of Historic Places cover documentation

1916 establishments in Oregon
Buildings and structures in The Dalles, Oregon
Former post office buildings
Government buildings completed in 1916
Individually listed contributing properties to historic districts on the National Register in Oregon
National Register of Historic Places in Wasco County, Oregon
Significant US Post Offices in Oregon 1900-1941 TR